Bardas (died 866) was uncle and regent of Emperor Michael III.

Bardas may also refer to:
Bardas Phokas the Elder (died 968), Byzantine general
Bardas Phokas the Younger (died 989), Byzantine general and rebel against Emperor Basil II
Bardas Skleros (died 991), Byzantine general and rebel against Emperor Basil II
Bardas Parsakoutenos, Byzantine general and grandson of Bardas Phokas the Elder

See also
Saint Vartan (387–451), Armenian military leader and martyr